Crazy Stupid Love may refer to:

 Crazy, Stupid, Love, a 2011 romantic comedy-drama film
 "Crazy Stupid Love" (song), a 2014 song by Cheryl Cole